Brendan Bell (born March 31, 1983) is a Canadian former professional ice hockey defenceman. Bell was selected by the Toronto Maple Leafs in the 3rd round (65th overall) of the 2001 NHL Entry Draft.

Playing career

Junior
Bell attended St. Pius X High School in Ottawa. Bell played in the CJHL for the Ottawa Jr. Senators. Bell then moved on to the Ontario Hockey League (OHL) with the Ottawa 67's where in four OHL seasons, he scored 32 goals and 171 points in 238 total games. In 2002–03, his final season with the 67's, he was named the team's captain. Bell was named the top defenseman in both the OHL and Canadian Hockey League that season. He also played on the silver-medal winning Canadian team in the 2003 World Junior Ice Hockey Championships, while registering one goal and two points in the tournament.

Professional
Bell was drafted in the third round, 65th overall, of the 2001 NHL Entry Draft by the Toronto Maple Leafs. Bell signed with the Maple Leafs in March 2003. He was assigned to the team's American Hockey League affiliate, the St. John's Maple Leafs. In 2003, Bell was selected to play for Team Canada at the Spengler Cup, which Team Canada won. He spent three years with the AHL team before Bell made his NHL debut with the Leafs in the 2005–06 season, playing one game.

On February 27, 2007, Bell was traded by the Leafs to the Phoenix Coyotes at the trade deadline along with a second round draft pick in for Yanic Perreault and a fifth round draft pick. He finished the season with the Coyotes, compiling one goal and six assists in 44 games. Phoenix re-signed Bell as a restricted free agent in the offseason to a one-year deal. Bell spent most of the following season with the Coyotes AHL affiliate, the San Antonio Rampage, playing in 69 games, scoring 7 goals and 31 points. He played two games in the NHL during the 2007–08 season, amassing no points.

On July 11, 2008, Bell signed as a free agent with the Ottawa Senators to a one-year contract. During the 2008–09 season he played in a career-high 53 games with the Senators, contributing 21 points. An unrestricted free agent following the season, on July 31, 2009, Bell signed with the St. Louis Blues on a one-year contract. After starting the 2009–10 season playing 22 games with AHL affiliate, the Peoria Rivermen, he was traded by St. Louis, along with Tomas Kana, to the Columbus Blue Jackets for Pascal Pelletier on December 8, 2009. Bell was immediately assigned to Columbus' AHL affiliate, the Syracuse Crunch.

On May 19, 2010, Bell signed a one-year contract with the Russian team Avangard Omsk of the Kontinental Hockey League. After a single game with Omsk, despite recording 2 assists, Bell signed with Swiss National League team EHC Biel. He played for the rest of the season with EHC Biel, recording 2 goals and 11 points in 29 games. Bell was a part of Team Canada for the second time at the 2010 Spengler Cup. Team Canada finished second in the tournament, losing to HC Davos in the final.

On August 3, 2011, Bell signed a contract with the New York Rangers. He appeared in a solitary game with the Rangers during the 2011–12 season, but primarily spent his time with the Connecticut Whale of the AHL.

For the 2012–13 season, Bell signed a one-year contract to play for the Frölunda Indians in the Swedish Hockey League. After an unproductive campaign with the Indians, he returned to EHC Biel for the 2013–14 season. In 2013, Bell was selected to play for Team Canada for the third time at the Spengler Cup. Team Canada was eliminated in the semi-finals by HC Geneve-Servette.

Prior to the 2014–15 season, Bell returned to North America and accepted a try-out invitation to attend the Anaheim Ducks training camp. He was reassigned to the Ducks AHL affiliate, the Norfolk Admirals to begin the year. Bell produced 23 points in 47 games from the blueline with the Admirals before he was traded for future considerations to the Chicago Wolves on March 3, 2015. In 2016, Bell signed with HC Bolzano of the Austrian Hockey League. Bell retired after a short stint with Bolzano.

Post retirement career
Following his retirement, Bell became a financial planner and owns a gym in Manotick, Ontario. He also became a broadcaster, joining Ottawa Senators game-day broadcasts on local radio station TSN 1200.

Career statistics

Regular season and playoffs

International

Awards
1998–99 CJHL All-Rookie Team
1998–99 CJHL Rookie of the Year Award
2002–03 OHL First All-Star Team
2002–03 OHL Max Kaminsky Trophy
2002–03 CHL First All-Star Team
2002–03 CHL Dewalt Top Defenceman Award

References

External links

1983 births
Living people
Avangard Omsk players
Binghamton Senators players
Bolzano HC players
Canadian ice hockey defencemen
Chicago Wolves players
Connecticut Whale (AHL) players
EHC Biel players
Frölunda HC players
Ice hockey people from Ottawa
New York Rangers players
Norfolk Admirals players
Ottawa 67's players
Ottawa Senators players
Peoria Rivermen (AHL) players
Phoenix Coyotes players
St. John's Maple Leafs players
San Antonio Rampage players
Syracuse Crunch players
Toronto Maple Leafs draft picks
Toronto Maple Leafs players
Toronto Marlies players
Canadian expatriate ice hockey players in Italy
Canadian expatriate ice hockey players in Russia
Canadian expatriate ice hockey players in Switzerland
Canadian expatriate ice hockey players in Sweden